Francisco Correa Hernández (1905 – death unknown), nicknamed "Cuco", was a Cuban shortstop in the Negro leagues in the 1920s and 1930s. 

A native of Havana, Cuba, Correa made his Negro leagues debut in 1926 with the Cuban Stars (West). He played for the club two more seasons, then played for the Cuban Stars (East) and New York Cubans.

References

External links
 and Baseball-Reference Black Baseball stats and Seamheads

1905 births
Date of birth missing
Place of death missing
Year of death missing
Cuban Stars (East) players
Cuban Stars (West) players
New York Cubans players
Baseball infielders